St. Teresa of Avila Catholic School may refer to:
 St. Theresa of Avila Catholic School - Grants, New Mexico - List of schools of the Roman Catholic Diocese of Gallup
 St. Theresa of Avila Catholic School - Carson City, Nevada - Roman Catholic Diocese of Reno
 St. Theresa of Avila School - Cincinnati, Ohio - Roman Catholic Archdiocese of Cincinnati